Santo Tomé is a city in the province of Corrientes in the Argentine Mesopotamia. It is the head town of the department of the same name.

The city lies in the north-east of the province, on the right-hand (western) shore of the Uruguay River, opposite the city of São Borja in Rio Grande do Sul, Brazil. The area has typical features of the Región Submisionera, with reddish soil, abundant flora and high lands, alternating with gray-soil lowlands and swamps. The climate is subtropical, with average temperatures of 20 °C (the summer maximum is 40 °C, and winters are mild). The average annual rainfall is between 1,400 and 1,600 mm, peaking in April (autumn) and October (spring).

Santo Tomé was founded in 1632 by the Jesuit missionaries Luis Ernot and Manuel Bertot, with help from two native Guaraní chiefs that converted to Christianity. Its name is variedly found as Santo Tomás, Santo Tomás Apóstol, Santo Thomé and Santo Tomé.

Notable people
 Clotilde González de Fernández (1880-1935), Argentine educator, piano teacher, writer

References

 

Populated places in Corrientes Province
Cities in Argentina
Corrientes Province
Argentina